P/2011 P1 (McNaught) was a Jupiter-family comet that passed extremely close to Jupiter on 4 December 2010 and disintegrated by 2012. It was discovered on 1 August 2011 by astronomer Robert H. McNaught at the Siding Spring Observatory in New South Wales, Australia. The earliest precovery image of the comet was taken by Pan-STARRS 1 on 6 December 2010, two days after the comet's close pass with Jupiter.

See also 
 Comet Shoemaker–Levy 9

References

External links 
 Jupiter vs. Comet P/2011 P1: No Contest, Gareth Williams, Minor Planet Center, 29 August 2011 (archived) 
 P/2011 P1 (McNaught), Seiichi Yoshida, updated 6 April 2013
 

Cometary object articles
Destroyed comets

Comets in 2011

20110801